LDAP Admin is a free, open-source LDAP directory management tool licensed under the GNU General Public License. Small and compact, LDAP Admin is also highly configurable through the use of the template extensions. In addition to common browsing and editing functions, LDAP Admin provides a directory management functionality by supporting a number of application-specific LDAP objects such as Posix and Samba groups and accounts, Postfix objects and a number of Active Directory objects. It also provides an XML-based template engine which extends the application in a seamless way allowing it to support virtually unlimited number of user defined objects.

Features
Some of the key features include:
Browsing and editing of LDAP directories
Recursive operations on directory trees (copy, move and delete)
Modify operations on datasets
Password management
Management of Posix Groups and Accounts
Management of Samba Groups and Accounts
Postfix MTA Support
Template support
Offline browsing and editing of LDIF files
As of version 1.3 the templates support for JavaScript and VBScript was introduced providing for a dynamic templates.

Limitations
LDAP Admin runs on the Windows operating systems only. By using the Wine software, it is apparently possible to run the application on a Linux and Mac OS X operating systems. There is also a Linux port (still Beta) of LdapAdmin.

See also 
List of LDAP software

References

External links

Products introduced in 2003
Directory services
Free software
Free software programmed in Delphi
Pascal (programming language) software